Charles E. Hockenberry (June 21, 1918 – March 15, 2007) was an American football, basketball, baseball player and coach.  He served as the head football coach at the West Virginia University Institute of Technology from 1947 to 1948, compiling a record of 10–8.  Hockenberry was also the head baseball coach at West Virginia University in 1947, tallying a mark of 9–7.

Playing career
Hockenberry earned his Bachelor of Science degree from West Virginia University in 1941. While there, he lettered in baseball, football, and basketball. After graduation, he played minor league baseball before enlisting in the United States Army Air Forces.

Coaching career
Hockenberry returned to West Virginia in 1952 and worked in the athletic department until 1978. He was inducted into the WVU Sports Hall of Fame in 2005.

References

External links
 

1918 births
2007 deaths
American football halfbacks
Baseball catchers
Allentown Wings players
Rochester Red Wings players
West Virginia Mountaineers baseball coaches
West Virginia Mountaineers baseball players
West Virginia Mountaineers football players
West Virginia Mountaineers men's basketball players
West Virginia Tech Golden Bears football coaches
People from Greene County, Pennsylvania
People from Indiana County, Pennsylvania
Players of American football from Pennsylvania
American men's basketball players
United States Army Air Forces personnel of World War II